Yakov Borisovich Estrin (Russian: Я́ков Бори́сович Эстрин, April 21, 1923 – February 2, 1987) was a Russian chess player, chess theoretician, writer, and World Correspondence Chess Champion who held the chess titles of International Master and International Correspondence Chess Grandmaster.

Chess biography
After a brief foray into  play, he turned to correspondence chess in the early 1960s with immediate success (joint first place in the USSR Correspondence Championship in 1962). He became an International Correspondence Chess Grandmaster in 1966, and would go on to compete in the final of the World Correspondence Championship five times. He is best known for being the seventh ICCF World Champion, 1972–1976.

For over-the-board play, he was awarded the International Master title in 1975.

Estrin wrote several chess books and was an authority on the Two Knights Defense.  His game with Hans Berliner in which Berliner played the Two Knights Defense and defeated Estrin is one of the most famous and important games in correspondence chess.

Books
 The Two Knights' Defence by Yakov Estrin, Chess Ltd.; English edition (1971). (no ISBN or LOC number)
 The Two Knights' Defence by Yakov Estrin, B.T.Batsford Ltd. (1983). .
 Three Double King Pawn Openings by Yakov Estrin, Chess Enterprises; first edition (June 1982). 
 Gambits by Yakov B. Estrin, Chess Enterprises (June 1983). 
 The United States Correspondence Chess Championship by Yakov Estrin, Correspondence Chess League of America (1978)
 Wilkes-Barre Variation, Two Knights Defense by Yakov Estrin, Chess Enterprises (June 1978). 
 Comprehensive Chess Openings, by Yakov Estrin and Vasily Panov, in three volumes, Pergamon, 1980.   (for set of three volumes in flexicover)
 малая дебютная знциклопедия (Translation = Concise Opening Encyclopedia), by Yakov Estrin, иэдательство  физкультура и спорт (Translation = Physical Culture and Sports), 1985. (no ISBN or LOC number)

Notes

References

External links
 
 

1923 births
1987 deaths
Correspondence chess grandmasters
World Correspondence Chess Champions
Chess theoreticians
Soviet chess players
Russian chess players
Jewish chess players
Russian chess writers
Russian Jews
Sportspeople from Moscow
20th-century chess players